The first season of Pinoy Dream Academy formally began on August 27, 2006, and ended on December 16 of the same year. Nikki Gil was the main host of this season, while joining her in the Saturday Gala Nights were Bianca Gonzalez, Roxanne Barcelo, and Toni Gonzaga. Sam Milby was also part of the Saturday shows, but had stopped appearing mid-season. Barcelo also hosted the UpLate edition of the show.

Yeng Constantino of Rizal was proclaimed as the "Grand Star Dreamer" of the first season on December 16, 2006. Jay-R Siaboc of Cebu and Ronnie Liang of Pampanga were proclaimed as the runners-up. The other finalists of the competition were Panky Trinidad of Cebu, Irish Fullerton of the United States of America and Chad Peralta of Australia. Constantino eventually became a successful recording artist in her own right.

Thirty-Eight contestants were chosen from different areas around the world. The Metro Manila dreamers all came from Metro Manila and nearby provinces. The dreamers from Luzon, Visayas and Mindanao are called the regional dreamers. The dreamers from Australia, San Francisco, Dubai, Japan and Europe are called the global dreamers.

Contestants 

On August 27, 2006, the Academy Dream Night took place in front of Cebu Provincial Capitol Grounds, hosted by Nikki Gil, Acoustic Jamming Section, where members were asked to sing their original composition; Music and Dance Section, where members sang popular dance songs; Music Literature Section, where members sang romantic ballads; Musicthectics Section, where members were asked to sing songs of the band, The Eraserheads, in their own style; Language of Music Section, where members sang native songs; and Rockers' Section, where members sang rock version of popular novelty songs. After two sections had performed, the hosts then announced the Academy finalists.

The selection of accepted finalists was done thrice, and 16 finalists accepted into the Academy on August 28. As a surprise twist, four more finalists were added to the roster and they entered the Academy the following day. The Scholars are expelled on the Saturday Gala Nights and Exit the Academy the next day.

Yeng Constantino was proclaimed the Grand Star Dreamer, followed by Jay-R Siaboc as the 2nd Star Dreamer and Ronnie Liang as the 3rd Star Dreamer. Panky Trinidad, Irish Fullerton and Chad Peralta were the other finalists of the competition.

Yeng Constantino (17, a "rebel-rocker" from Rodriguez, Rizal)Songs Performed

 Hawak Kamay - Yeng Constantino, with Davey, Joan, Jun and Ronnie
 Dinggin - Davey Langit, with Iya, Kristoff, Michelle and RJ
 The Day You said Goodnight - Hale, with Chad, Michelle, RJ and Yvan
 Ang Pag-ibig Kong Ito - Moonstar88, medley with Michelle and Oona
 Ligaya - The Eraserheads, duet with RJ
 I Will Always Love You - Whitney Houston
 Pangarap Lang - Alvin K. Gonzales, medley with Jay-R, Panky and Rosita
 In My Life - Patti Austin
 Together Again - Janet Jackson, medley with Eman and Panky
 You Oughta Know - Alanis Morissette, medley with Chad and Panky
 Bulag, Pipi at Bingi - Freddie Aguilar
 I Will Survive - Gloria Gaynor
 I'll Never Get Over You Getting Over Me - Exposé
 Pag-alis - Barbie Almalbis, performance with Barbie Almalbis
 Awit ng Kabataan - Rivermaya (Opening Act), trio with Irish and Panky, Winner - December 16, 2006
 Queen of the Night - Whitney Houston, medley and trio with Irish and Panky, Winner - December 16, 2006
 Respect - Aretha Franklin, medley and trio with Irish and Panky, Winner - December 16, 2006
 I'm Every Woman - Chaka Khan, medley and trio with Irish and Panky, Winner - December 16, 2006
 Lady Marmalade - Labelle, medley and trio with Irish and Panky, Winner - December 16, 2006
 Himala - Rivermaya, duet with Jay-R, Winner - December 16, 2006
 Salamat - Yeng Constantino (Final Three Song), Winner - December 16, 2006

Jay-R Siaboc (19, the vocalist of Scrambled Eggs band from Cebu)Songs Performed

 Babalik Rin - Yvan Lambatan, with Irish, Kristoff, Oona and Yvan
 Hilot - Jay-R Siaboc, with Chad, Eman, Jun and Yvan
 Isang Linggong Pag-ibig - Imelda Papin, with Geoff, Irish, Iya, Jun and Panky
 Arigato Tomodaci - Eman Abatayo, Jun Hirano and Jay-R Siaboc, with Eman, Kristoff and RJ (with Jun)
 Nanliligaw, Naliligaw - Lloyd Umali and Ima Castro, duet with Iya
 Hanggang - Wency Cornejo, medley with Chai, Irish, Ronnie and Rosita
 May Tama Ako - Rickenson Calubad, medley with Panky, Rosita and Yeng
 Ang Seksing Nobya Ko - unknown performer, medley with Iya
 Banal na Aso - Yano
 Too Much Love Will Kill You - Queen
 Salamat - Dawn, medley with Davey, Ronnie and Yvan
 Have Yourself a Merry Little Christmas - Judy Garland
 Naglibog - Scrambled Eggs
 Ever Since the World Began - Survivor
 Bitiw - Sponge Cola, performance with Sponge Cola
 Superhero - Rocksteddy (Opening Act), trio with Chad and Ronnie, 1st Runner-Up - December 16, 2006
 Kiss - Prince and The Revolution, medley and trio with Chad and Ronnie, 1st Runner-Up - December 16, 2006
 Da Ya Think I'm Sexy? - Rod Stewart, medley and trio with Chad and Ronnie, 1st Runner-Up - December 16, 2006
 Simply Irresistible - Robert Palmer, medley and trio with Chad and Ronnie, 1st Runner-Up - December 16, 2006
 Himala - Rivermaya, duet with Yeng, 1st Runner-Up - December 16, 2006
 Kisapmata - Rivermaya (Final Three Song), 1st Runner-Up - December 16, 2006

Ronnie Liang (21, a former Pinoy Pop Superstar contestant from Angeles City)Songs Performed

 Hawak Kamay - Yeng Constantino, with Davey, Joan, Jun and Yeng
 Salamat Sa'Yo Ina - Ronnie Liang, with Davey, Gemma, Joan and Oona
 Karaniwang Tao - Joey Ayala, with Chai, Davey, Eman and Joan
 Magdalena - Freddie Aguilar (Tagalog with Italian translation), with Chad, Irish and Joan
 Kailangan Mo, Kailangan Ko - Richard Tan and Bambi Bonus, trio with Michelle and Oona
 Maging Sino Ka Man - Rey Valera, medley with Chai, Irish, Jay-R and Rosita
 Kung Kailangan Mo Ako - Rey Valera
 Macho Gwapito - Rico J. Puno
 Paglisan - Color It Red. medley with Chai and Jay-r
 Pangako Sa'yo - Sharon Cuneta
 Narda - Kamikazee, medley with Davey, Jay-R and Yvan
 Sana Ngayong Pasko - Ariel Rivera
 You Raise Me Up - Josh Groban
 Babaero - Randy Santiago
 Nakapagtataka - Sponge Cola, performance with Sponge Cola
 Superhero - Rocksteddy (Opening Act), trio with Chad and Jay-R, 2nd Runner-Up - December 16, 2006
 Kiss - Prince and The Revolution, medley and trio with Chad and Jay-R, 2nd Runner-Up - December 16, 2006
 Da Ya Think I'm Sexy? - Rod Stewart, medley and trio with Chad and Jay-R, 2nd Runner-Up - December 16, 2006
 Simply Irresistible - Robert Palmer, medley and trio with Chad and Jay-R, 2nd Runner-Up - December 16, 2006
 Habang May Buhay - Donna Cruz, duet with Irish,2nd Runner-Up - December 16, 2006
 Nais Ko - Basil Valdez (Final Three Song), 2nd Runner-Up - December 16, 2006

Panky Trinidad (20, a passionate musician from Cebu)Songs Performed

 Sunshine - Chad Peralta, with Chad, Chai, Gemma, and Rosita
 Behind Those Eyes - Panky Trinidad, with Chai, Geoff, Irish and Rosita
 Isang Linggong Pag-ibig - Imelda Papin, with Geoff, Irish, Iya, Jay-R and Jun
 No Touch - Rico J. Puno (Tagalog with Ilocano and Cebuano translation), with Chai, Davey, Geoff, Rosita and Yvan
 Yugyugan Na - Pot, duet with Eman
 Hard to Handle - Black Crowes
 Karamay - Gabriel Jesse T. Guevarra, medley with Jay-R, Rosita and Yeng
 Point of No Return -Zsazsa Padilla, medley with Irish
 Bring Me to Life - Evanescence, medley with Eman and Yeng
 Proud Mary - Creedence Clearwater Revival, medley with Chad and Yeng
 Beep Beep - Juan Dela Cruz, medley with Chad and Joan
 Santa Claus Is Coming to Town - Dolly Parton
 Crazy - Aerosmith
 T-R-O-U-B-L-E - Elvis Presley
 Taralets - Imago, performance with Imago
 Awit ng Kabataan - Rivermaya (Opening Act), trio with Irish and Yeng, Top 4 Finalist - December 16, 2006
 Queen of the Night - Whitney Houston, medley and trio with Irish and Yeng, Top 4 Finalist - December 16, 2006
 Respect - Aretha Franklin, medley and trio with Irish and Yeng, Top 4 Finalist - December 16, 2006
 I'm Every Woman - Chaka Khan, medley and trio with Irish and Yeng, Top 4 Finalist - December 16, 2006
 Lady Marmalade - Labelle, medley and trio with Irish and Yeng, Top 4 Finalist - December 16, 2006
 Gemini - Sponge Cola, duet with Chad, Top 4 Finalist - December 16, 2006
 We Will Rock You - Queen (Farewell Song), Top 4 Finalist - December 16, 2006

Irish Fullerton (23, a nursing student from California)Songs Performed

 Babalik Rin - Yvan Lambatan, with Jay-R, Kristoff, Oona and Yvan
 Behind Those Eyes - Panky Trinidad, with Chai, Geoff, Panky and Rosita
 Isang Linggong Pag-ibig - Imelda Papin, with Geoff, Iya, Jay-R, Jun and Panky
 Magdalena - Freddie Aguilar (Tagalog with Italian translation), with Chad, Joan and Ronnie
 I Finally Found Someone - Barbra Streisand and Bryan Adams, duet with Chad
 Kailan Kaya - Sheryn Regis, medley with Chai, Jay-R, Ronnie and Rosita
 You Moved Me - Elisette Blancaflor, medley with Chad, Chai and Joan
 Larger than Life - Zsazsa Padilla, medley with Panky
 Somewhere - West Side Story
 I'll Never Love This Way Again - Dionne Warwick, medley with Joan and Michelle
 Ang Himig Natin - Juan Dela Cruz, medley with Rosita and Yeng
 O Holy Night - Mariah Carey
 Over the Rainbow - Judy Garland
 Hiram - Zsazsa Padilla
 Ewan - Imago, performance with Imago
 Awit ng Kabataan - Rivermaya (Opening Act), trio with Panky and Yeng, Top 5 Finalist - December 16, 2006
 Queen of the Night - Whitney Houston, medley and trio with Panky and yeng, Top 5 Finalist - December 16, 2006
 Respect - Aretha Franklin, medley and trio with Panky and Yeng, Top 5 Finalist - December 16, 2006
 I'm Every Woman - Chaka Khan, medley and trio with Panky and Yeng, Top 5 Finalist - December 16, 2006
 Lady Marmalade - Labelle, medley and trio with Panky and Yeng, Top 5 Finalist - December 16, 2006
 Habang May Buhay - Donna Cruz, duet with Ronnie, Top 5 Finalist - December 16, 2006
 Sana'y Maghintay Ang Walang Hanggan - Zsazsa Padilla (Farewell Song), Top 5 Finalist - December 16, 2006

Richard "Chad" Peralta (21, an IT consultant from Australia)Songs Performed

 Sunshine - Chad Peralta, with Chai, Gemma, Panky and Rosita
 Hilot - Jay-R Siaboc, with Eman, Jay-R, Jun and Yvan
 The Day You said Goodnight - Hale, with Michelle, RJ, Yeng and Yvan
 Magdalena - Freddie Aguilar (Tagalog with Italian translation), with Irish, Joan and Ronnie
 I Finally Found Someone - Barbra Streisand and Bryan Adams, duet with Irish
 Bitiw - Sponge Cola, medley with RJ and Yvan
 Krishna's Eyes - Edgardo P. Miraflor Jr., medley with Chai, Irish and Joan
 Anak - Freddie Aguilar
 Bed of Roses - Bon Jovi
 Put Your Head on My Shoulder - Paul Anka, medley with Panky and Yeng
 Laklak - Teeth, medley with Joan and Panky
 Do They Know It's Christmas? - Band Aid
 If Tomorrow Never Comes - Garth Brooks
 With or Without You - U2
 Stars - CallaLily, performance with CallaLily
 Superhero - Rocksteddy, trio with Jay-R and Ronnie, Top 6 Finalist - December 16, 2006
 Kiss - Prince and The Revolution, medley and trio with Jay-R and Ronnie, Top 6 Finalist - December 16, 2006
 Da Ya Think I'm Sexy? - Rod Stewart, medley and trio with Jay-R and Ronnie, Top 6 Finalist - December 16, 2006
 Simply Irresistible - Robert Palmer, medley and trio with Jay-R and Ronnie, Top 6 Finalist - December 16, 2006
 Gemini - Sponge Cola, duet with Panky, Top 6 Finalist - December 16, 2006
 Love Story - Francis Lai (Farewell Song), Top 6 Finalist - December 16, 2006

Rosita Bareng (25, an OFW from Dubai)Songs Performed

 Sunshine - Chad Peralta, with Chad, Chai, Gemma and Panky
 Behind Those Eyes - Panky Trinidad, with Chai, Geoff, Irish and Panky
 Tuwing Umuulan - Regine Velasquez
 No Touch - Rico J. Puno (Tagalog with Ilocano and Cebuano translation), with Chai, Davey, Geoff, Panky and Yvan
 Halik - Aegis
 Bituing Walang Ningning - Sharon Cuneta, medley with Chai, Irish, Jay-R and Ronnie
 Tanging Ikaw Lamang - Markel Cesar A. Luna, medley with Jay-R, Panky and Yeng
 Sana'y Wala Nang Wakas - Sharon Cuneta
 Total Eclipse of the Heart - Bonnie Tyler, medley with Davey and Joan
 Bakit Ako Mahihiya - Didith Reyes
 Bakit - Aegis, medley with Irish and Yeng
 Christmas All Over the World - Sheena Easton
 Basang-basa sa Ulan - Aegis
 Ako ang Nasawi, Ako ang Nagwagi - Dulce
 When I Met You - Barbie Almalbis, performance with Barbie Almalbis, Expelled - December 9, 2006
 Hindi Ako Laruan - Imelda Papin (Farewell Song), Expelled - December 9, 2006

Yvan Lambatan (24, a father from Baguio)Songs Performed

 Babalik Rin - Yvan Lambatan, with Irish, Jay-R, Kristoff and Oona
 Hilot - Jay-R Siaboc, with Chad, Eman, Jay-R and Jun
 The Day You said Goodnight - Hale, with Chad, Michelle, RJ and Yeng
 No Touch - Rico J. Puno (Tagalog with Ilocano and Cebuano translation), with Chai, Davey, Geoff, Panky and Rosita
 Dahil Ikaw - True Faith
 Tuloy pa Rin - Neocolours, medley with Chad and RJ
 Pag Nandiyan Siya - Ernest Yvan Cruz Esguerra, medley with Davey and Eman
 Eto Na Naman - Gary Valenciano, duet with Eman
 Say You'll Never Go - Neocolours
 Overjoyed - Stevie Wonder
 Sandalan - 6 Cycle Mind
 Pasko Na, Sinta Ko - Gary Valenciano
 Alipin - Shamrock
 Open Arms - Journey
 Take My Hand - CallaLily, performance with CallaLily, Expelled - December 9, 2006
 Iris - Goo Goo Dolls (Farewell Song), performance with CallaLily, Expelled - December 9, 2006

Eman Abatayo (22, an accountancy graduate from Iloilo)Songs Performed

 Miss Kita Pag Tuesday - RJ Jimenez, with Geoff, Iya, Michelle and RJ
 Hilot - Jay-R Siaboc, with Chad, Jay-R, Jun and Yvan
 Karaniwang Tao - Joey Ayala, with Chai, Davey, Joan and Ronnie
 Arigato Tomodaci - Eman Abatayo, Jun Hirano and Jay-R Siaboc, with Jay-R, Kristoff and RJ (with Jun)
 Yugyugan Na - Pot, duet with Panky
 Daliri - Kjwan
 Wishing Lampara - Mark Eduard de Mesa and Michael Sapico, medley with Davey and Yvan
 Eto Na Naman - Gary Valenciano, duet with Yvan
 Sometimes a Fantasy - Billy Joel, medley with Panky and Yeng
 You Give Love a Bad Name - Bon Jovi
 Tayo'y Mga Pinoy - Francis Magalona
 Merry Christmas, Break na Tayo - Eman Abatayo
 I'll Be - Edwin McCain
 Higher - Creed, Expelled - December 2, 2006

Davey Langit (19, a guitar instructor from Baguio)Songs Performed

 Hawak Kamay - Yeng Constantino, with Joan, Jun, Ronnie and Yeng
 Salamat Sa'Yo Ina - Ronnie Liang, with Gemma, Joan, Oona and Ronnie
 Karaniwang Tao - Joey Ayala, with Chai, Eman, Joan and Ronnie
 No Touch - Rico J. Puno (Tagalog with Ilocano and Cebuano translation), with Chai, Geoff, Panky, Rosita and Yvan
 Maling Akala - Brownman Revival, duet with Kristoff
 There is No Easy Way - James Ingram
 Ako - Soc Villanueva, medley with Eman and Yvan
 Mamang Kutsero - APO Hiking Society, duet with Chai
 Kahit Ika'y Panaginip Lamang - Basil Valdez, medley with Joan and Rosita
 Just The Way You Are - Billy Joel, medley with Jay-R
 Jeepney - Sponge Cola, medley with Jay-R, Ronnie and Yvan
 Miss Kita Kung Christmas - Sharon Cuneta
 Spending My Life With You - Davey Langit, Expelled - November 25, 2006

Joan Jane Ilagan (20, a law student from Italy)Songs Performed

 Hawak Kamay - Yeng Constantino, with Davey, Jun, Ronnie and Yeng
 Salamat Sa'Yo Ina - Ronnie Liang, with Davey, Gemma, Oona and Ronnie
 Karaniwang Tao - Joey Ayala, with Chai, Davey, Eman and Ronnie
 Magdalena - Freddie Aguilar (Tagalog with Italian translation), with Chad, Irish and Ronnie
 Broken Vow - Lara Fabian
 It's All Coming Back to Me Now - Celine Dion, medley with Iya and Michelle
 Go With My Heart - Gino Torres, medley with Chad, Chai and Irish
 Movie Fans - Maricel Soriano
 One Sweet Day - Mariah Carey and Boyz II Men, medley with Davey and Rosita
 All At Once - The Fray, medley with Irish and Michelle
 Nosi Balasi - Sampaguita, medley with Chad and Panky
 Silent Night - Mariah Carey - Expelled - November 18, 2006

Michelle Bond (24, a part-time singer from Amsterdam)Songs Performed

 Miss Kita Pag Tuesday - RJ Jimenez, with Eman, Geoff, Iya and RJ
 Dinggin - Davey Langit, with Iya, Kristoff, RJ and Yeng
 The Day You said Goodnight - Hale, with Chad, RJ, Yeng and Yvan
 Mahal Kita, Walang Iba - Ogie Alcasid, medley with Oona and Yeng
 Kailangan Mo, Kailangan Ko - Richard Tan and Bambi Bonus, trio with Oona and Ronnie
 We Belong - Toni Gonzaga, medley with Iya and Joan
 Don't Cry for Me Argentina - Madonna
 Without You - Mariah Carey
 Love Moves in Mysterious Ways - Julia Fordham
 I Honestly Love You - Olivia Newton-John, medley with Irish and Joan, Expelled - November 5, 2006

Chai Fonancier (20, the vocalist of Balde ni Allan band from Cagayan de Oro)Songs Performed

 Sunshine - Chad Peralta, with Chad, Gemma, Panky and Rosita
 Behind Those Eyes - Panky Trinidad, with Geoff, Irish, Panky and Rosita
 Karaniwang Tao - Joey Ayala, with Davey, Eman, Joan and Ronnie
 No Touch - Rico J. Puno (Tagalog with Ilocano and Cebuano translation), with Davey, Geoff, Panky, Rosita and Yvan
 Anungan - Grace Nono
 Kung Ako na Lang Sana - Bituin Escalante, medley with Irish, Jay-R, Ronnie and Rosita
 Unfair - Michael Plaga Ong, medley with Chad, Irish and Joan
 Mamang Kutsero - Apo Hiking Society, duet with Davey
 Sino ang Baliw - Kuh Ledesma, medley with Jay-R and Ronnie
 Get Here - Brenda Russell, Expelled - November 4, 2006

Iya Ginez (21, SK Chairwoman Pangasinan)Songs Performed

 Miss Kita Pag Tuesday - RJ Jimenez, with Eman, Geoff, Michelle and RJ
 Dinggin - Davey Langit, with Kristoff, Michelle, RJ and Yeng
 Isang Linggong Pag-ibig - Imelda Papin, with Geoff, Irish, Jay-R, Jun and Panky
 Kahit Na - Ogie Alcasid
 Nanliligaw, Naliligaw - Lloyd Umali and Ima Castro, duet with Jay-R
 Stay - Carol Banawa, medley with Joan and Michelle
 Minsan ang Minahal ay Ako - Celeste Legaspi
 Ang Boyfriend Kong Baduy - Cinderella, medley with Jay-R
 Sweet Love - Anita Baker, Expelled - October 28, 2006

Kristoff Abrenica (20, a grocery clerk from Canada)Songs Performed

 Babalik Rin - Yvan Lambatan, with Irish, Jay-R, Oona and Yvan
 Dinggin - Davey Langit, with Iya, Michelle, RJ and Yeng
 Kailangan Kita - Martin Nievera
 Arigato Tomodaci - Eman Abatayo, Jun Hirano and Jay-R Siaboc, with Eman, Jay-R and RJ (with Jun)
 Maling Akala - Brownman Revival, duet with Davey
 Win - Brian McKnight
 She's Out of My Life - Michael Jackson
 Let Me - Kristoff Abrenica, Automatically Expelled - October 21, 2006

RJ Jimenez (22, a University of Santo Tomas graduate from Pasig)Songs Performed

 Miss Kita Pag Tuesday - RJ Jimenez, with Eman, Geoff, Iya and Michelle
 Dinggin - Davey Langit, with Iya, Kristoff, Michelle and Yeng
 The Day You said Goodnight - Hale, with Chad, Michelle, Yeng and Yvan
 Arigato Tomodaci - Eman Abatayo, Jun Hirano and Jay-R Siaboc, with Eman, Jay-R and Kristoff (with Jun)
 Ligaya - the Eraserheads, duet with Yeng
 She Could Be - Corbin Bleu, medley with Chad and Yvan
 1000 Things - Jason Mraz, Expelled - October 14, 2006

Oona Barretto (23, a former pre-school teacher from Bukidnon)Songs Performed

 Babalik Rin - Yvan Lambatan, with Irish, Jay-R, Kristoff and Yvan
 Salamat Sa'Yo Ina - Ronnie Liang, with Davey, Gemma, Joan and Ronnie
 Paalam Na - Dingdong Avanzado
 Sana Maulit Muli - Gary Valenciano, medley with Michelle and Yeng
 Kailangan Mo, Kailangan Ko - Richard Tan and Bambi Bonus, trio with Michelle and Ronnie
 Out Here on My Own - Irene Cara, Expelled - October 7, 2006

Geoff Taylor (20, a model from Cagayan Valley)Songs Performed

 Miss Kita Pag Tuesday - RJ Jimenez, with Eman, Iya, Michelle and RJ
 Behind Those Eyes - Panky Trinidad, with Geoff, Irish, Panky and Rosita
 Isang Linggong Pag-ibig - Imelda Papin, with Irish, Iya, Jay-R, Jun and Panky
 No Touch - Rico J. Puno (Tagalog with Ilocano and Cebuano translation), with Chai, Davey, Panky, Rosita and Yvan
 Ako'y Sa'yo Ika'y Akin - Iaxe, Expelled - September 30, 2006

Songs Performed

 Hawak Kamay - Yeng Constantino, with Davey, Jun, Ronnie and Yeng
 Hilot - Jay-R Siaboc, with Chad, Eman, Jay-R and Yvan
 Isang Linggong Pag-ibig - Imelda Papin, with Geoff, Irish, Iya, Jay-R and Panky
 Sukiyaki - Kyu Sakamoto, Dropped Out - September 23, 2006

Gemma Fitzgerald (20, a medical administrative officer from Australia, member of Koolchx)Songs Performed

 Sunshine - Chad Peralta, with Chad, Chai, Panky and Rosita
 Salamat Sa'Yo Ina - Ronnie Liang, with Davey, Joan, Oona and Ronnie
 Ikaw - Regine Velasquez, Expelled - September 16, 2006

Faculty 
Headmaster: Jim Paredes
Dance Teacher: Maribeth Bichara
Fitness Teacher: Gretchen Malalad
Voice Teachers: Moy Ortiz, Annie Quintos, Cecile Bautista, Sweet Plantado
Diction Teacher: Von Arroyo
Performance Teacher: Malou de Guzman
Media Performance Teacher: Joey Reyes
Songwriting Teacher: Raimund Marasigan
Belly Dance Teacher: Kat Fonacier
Media Ethics Teacher: Boots Anson-Roa
Technical Voice Teacher: Kitchie Molina (former juror of several PDA Performance Nights)

Personalities who visited the academy 

Bamboo
Barbie Almalbis
Boy Abunda
Callalily
Ethel Booba
Hale
Imago
Parokya ni Edgar
Lea Salonga
Luis Manzano
Mig Ayesa
Moonstar88
Raimund Marasigan
Sponge Cola
Vilma Santos
Orange and Lemons

Performances inside the Academy

Week 1 and Week 2: Gala Performance Night 
In Weeks 1 and 2, the show was called the 1st and 2nd Gala Performance Night, respectively. In both gala nights, the contestants were put into four groups and they sang the original compositions of seven of the contestants, and one of the NCR Dreamers. These were Yeng's "Hawak Kamay", Richard's "Sunshine", Yvan's "Babalik Rin", RJ's "Miss Kita Pag Tuesday", Davey's "Dinggin", Panky's "Behind Those Eyes", Jay-R's "Hilot" and Jenner Mallari's "Salamat Sa'Yo Ina".

Week 2: 1st Nomination Night 
Three prominent people from the Philippines' music industry, termed the jurors, were invited to this week's show, as well as to the succeeding performance nights up to the present, to judge the performance of the contestants. In this show, the contestants they nominated for expulsion were Kristoff, Rosita, Oona, and Gemma.

Week 3: 1st Expulsion Night 
This show had a different format from the Gala Performance Nights, and this format has been implemented ever since. The probationary students each had to give solo performances, while the contestants not on probation were put into groups of varying number and they either sing as a group or perform a medley. Gemma was the first expelled scholar from the Academy. Kristoff was saved by the viewers, Rosita was saved by the faculty and Oona was saved by her co-scholars winning 14 out of 18 votes. For the 1st Expulsion Night, the theme of the songs performed by the contestants not on probation was a crossing over of genres. The novelty song "Isang Linggong Pag-ibig" was given a Latin flavor. The folksong "Karaniwang Tao" was sung in an ethnic rock version, and Hale's song "The Day You Said Goodnight" was performed with a techno-alternative vibe.

Week 4: 2nd and 3rd Nomination Night 
Week 4's Monday episode was the 2nd Nomination Night wherein Oona, Michelle, Yeng and Jun were nominated for expulsion. Week 4's Saturday show was called the 3rd Nomination Night instead of the 2nd Expulsion Night, because of Jun. He was not expelled because he opted to drop out from the academy. He was one of the four probationary students named in the 2nd Nomination Night, and his actions saved the other three nominees. The theme of the songs performed by the non-probationary seemed to coincide with Jun's departure, for the lyrics of their performance songs were translated to other languages and Filipino dialects. Freddie Aguilar's "Magdalena" was partly translated to Italian. "No Touch" was sung in Ilocano and Visayan. Eman and Jun's composition "Arigato Tomodachi" had some lines in Japanese. The coincidence is due to the fact that Jun did not develop a fluency in Tagalog during his stay in the Academy.

Week 5: 3rd Expulsion Night 
Week 5's Saturday show was the 3rd Expulsion Night and in this episode, out of the 4 probationary contestants (Rosita, Chai, Yvan and Geoff), Geoff was the expelled student. Yvan was saved by the viewers, Rosita was saved by the faculty and Chai was saved by her co-contestants winning 11 out of 16 votes. The contestants not on probation sang in duets.

Week 6: 4th Probation and Expulsion Night 
The Sunday night after the 3rd Expulsion Night came the 4th Probation Night wherein Kristoff, Oona, Davey and Yeng were named the probationary contestants. For the 4th Expulsion Night, Oona was the expelled student. Kristoff was saved by the viewers, Yeng was saved by the faculty and Davey was saved by his co-contestants winning 10 out of 15 votes. The non-nominees sang popular songs in a medley format.

Week 7: 5th Probation and Expulsion Night 
After the 4th Expulsion Night came the 5th Probation Night on Sunday. It was Kristoff, Michelle, Iya and RJ who were nominated. On the 5th Expulsion Night, RJ was the expelled student. Kristoff was saved by the viewers, Iya was saved by the faculty and Michelle was saved by her co-contestants winning 12 out of 14 votes. Those not in probation sang some of the winning songs of the Dream Songwriting Competition. The songs performed were "Pag Nandiyan Siya" by Ernest Yvan Cruz Esguerra, "Wishing Lampara" by Mark Eduard de Mesa and Michael Sapico, "Ako" by Soc Villanueva, "Unfair" by Michael Plaga Ong, "Krishna's Eyes" by Edgardo P. Miraflor Jr., "You Moved Me" by Elisette Blancaflor, "Go with My Heart" by Gino Torres, "May Tama Ako" by Rickenson Calubad, "Tanging Ikaw Lamang" by Markel Cesar A. Luna, "Karamay" by Gabriel Jesse T. Guevarra, and "Pangarap Lang" by Alvin K. Gonzales.

Week 8: 6th Probation and Expulsion Night 
The 6th Expulsion Night took place on week 8, and Kristoff was the expelled student. He was automatically expelled because he received one of the four low grades from the jurors of the performances that week. His scores made him a probationary student for the following week's expulsion night, and it would have been his fifth time of being on probation. His automatic expulsion was due to an additional rule implemented by the academy on week 7. The new rule stated that contestants who get nominated five times will be automatically expelled so that the academy can maintain its standard of excellence.

Week 9: Midterm Exams, 7th Probation and Expulsion Night 
The probationary contestants were Yvan, Iya, Irish and Michelle. During this week, the contestants faced their midterm exams. They were tested by the academy's faculty on their knowledge in musical theories, their media and dance performances, their fitness, and their diction. On the expulsion night, Iya was the expelled student. Giving the best in her rendition of Anita Baker's Sweet Love, some of the audiences were shocked in her expulsion. Irish was saved by the viewers, Yvan was saved by the faculty and Michelle was saved by her co-contestants winning 9 out of 12 votes.

Week 10: 8th Probation and Expulsion Night 
Last 7th Expulsion Night, Rosita was automatically put on probation because she got the lowest score in the midterm exams (having 68%). During the 8th Probation Night, Eman, Chai, and Ronnie got the lowest marks from the jurors and they completed the list of four contestants on probationary status. This week was the start of the 2nd semester inside the Academy. At the 8th Expulsion Night, Chai was the expelled student. Ronnie was saved by the viewers, Rosita was saved by the faculty and Eman was saved by his co-contestants winning 6 out of 11 votes. All the contestants sang classics from world icons Stevie Wonder, Dionne Warwick, Billy Joel, among others, as well as Filipino hitmakers like Didith Reyes and Rey Valera.

Week 11: 9th and 10th Probation Night 
On the 9th Probation Night, Michelle was automatically expelled. It was her fifth time being on probation, for she received one of the four low grades from the jurors of the 8th Expulsion Night. As with Kristoff's case, her automatic expulsion was due to the five-probation rule. Her expulsion ensured the safety of the three other probationary students, namely Jay-R, Davey, and Irish. Because of Michelle's exit, the Performance Night on Saturday became the 10th Probation Night. In this episode, all finalists sang Filipino rock songs. The finalists who were put on probation were Joan, Jay-R, Davey, and Irish. The other 7 finalists who were not nominated were put on the Headmaster's List and have been guaranteed spots in the final 10.

Week 12: 10th Expulsion Night 
At the beginning of the episode, 7 finalists were already confirmed to be in the Headmaster's List. The finalists sang their own renditions of classical and modern Christmas songs. Joan was expelled from the Academy, as she got only 4 save votes from her co-finalists. Jay-R was saved by viewer's votes, Irish was saved by the faculty and Davey got the 5 save votes from his co-finalists.

Week 13: 11th Probation and Expulsion Night 
Davey was expelled from the academy, he got the lowest votes from the viewers.

Week 14: 12th Expulsion Night 
Eman was expelled from the academy. There will be no Probation nights starting this week.
The new rule is that, the finalists who has the lowest number of votes next expulsion night will be expelled. The viewers have the fate of the finalists till this day on.
The viewers will decide who will be at the Honors list of 6.

Week 15: Final Expulsion Night 
The two finalists, who has the lowest number of votes this week, are Yvan and Rosita. They are the ones who were expelled from the academy. The six finalists left are Jay-R, Yeng, Panky, Irish, Ronnie, and Chad. They are the one who will face-off at the Grand Dream Night.

Week 16: Preparations for the Grand Dream Night 
The finalists prepared themselves for their biggest night ever. They were busy all week long. Doing rehearsals for their performances, for both dance and songs. Also they had a special taping for the ABS-CBN Christmas special. At the same time they had a chance to meet their own idols and fans of their own.

Finale: Grand Dream Night 

After sixteen weeks of training, six finalists remained. The Pinoy Dream Academy culminated with the "Grand Dream Night", which will proclaim the "Grand Star Dreamer", held on December 16, 2006, at the Araneta Coliseum packed with thousands of fans and supporters.

After the honor list of six performed along with guest singers, voting was temporarily closed to find out who made it in the top three. Panky, Chad, and Irish rounded out the bottom three while Ronnie, Jay-R, and Yeng had the highest number of votes. The top three faced off each other with solo performances.

Garnering 558,912 votes or 29.9% of the total votes, Ronnie was declared as Pinoy Dream Academy's second runner-up. Yeng won the competition becoming the first "Grand Star Dreamer" getting a total of 697,648 votes (37.32%) placing Jay-R as the first runner-up with 612,767 votes (32.77%). The total number of votes of the top 6 from December 2–16, 2006 was 2,956,362 votes. During the finale, ABS-CBN launched their new Philippine National Anthem music video that was aired on the network together with Studio 23 during Sign-on and sign-off until June 12, 2011. The 2006 national anthem MTV is still played on radio via DZMM Radyo Patrol 630, and MOR 101.9.

Prizes 
All finalists received Belgian Waffle Mallcarts. The runners-up received an additional motorcycle from Suzuki, a brand new condominium unit in Chateau Valenzuela from Globe Asiatique, cash prizes from Fitrum (a vitamin supplement, P200,000 for the third placer and P500,000 for the second placer) and a recording contract.

The Grand Star Dreamer, Yeng Constantino, received a brand-new Suzuki Swift, a condo unit at G.A. Towers, a 60-inch SXRD Sony Bravia, a Touch music video unit, a Belgian Waffle dine-in franchise, a recording contract, and 1 million pesos from Fitrum.

Scholars' Grades 

Grades in RED indicate that the scholar is on probationary status.
Grades in DARK GREEN indicate that the contestant was the Star Scholar of the week.
Grades in  YELLOW GREEN indicate that the scholar received the highest grade for the week, but was not the Star Scholar.
Grades highlighted in BLACK indicate that the scholar's grade was not counted for the organization's grade and their average grade.

Expulsion Nights 

The four scholars with the lowest scores of the Gala Night will be put on probation. These four scholars will be voted by the viewing public from the said Gala Night until the next Gala Night. The scholar with the highest text votes will be saved. Among the three remaining probationary scholars, the mentors will be choosing the scholar to save. The remaining two probationary scholars will then be voted by the scholars and the scholar with the lower number of votes from the scholars is expelled from the Academy.

The Number indicated in the first row are the Gala Nights wherein the scholar indicated in the last row was expelled. There were no probationary scholars during the 1st Gala Night. The first set of Probationary scholars were announced during the 2nd Gala Night and the first expulsion happened in the 3rd Gala Night. In the 14th Gala Night, there was no probation as the top 8 scholars were voted by the viewing public. The two scholars with the lowest vote turn-out were expelled from the Academy in the 15th Gala Night. Therefore, the 15th Gala Night was just a Gala Night for the expulsion of the last two scholars and the announcement of the Honor List of 6.

: The finalists cast votes to save one of the last two nominees. The nominee who got the fewer number of votes would be expelled.
: Jun opted to leave the Academy because of loneliness, further worsened by his frequent nosebleeds and large language barrier, because he could not speak English and Filipino. He made his exit on September 24, with his last gala night on September 23. That night was supposedly the 2nd Expulsion Night, but because of Jun's exit, it became the 3rd Nomination Night.
: Panky was this week's star scholar as she got the highest grade of 9.50 for the week. However, since she was the star scholar the previous week, Ronnie was awarded the distinction instead as he got the second-highest grade of 9.33. This was done to give other finalists a chance to become the star scholar for the week.
: Richard was the Viewer's Choice for this week, as announced by the hosts at the end of the episode. However, the support he got from the voters did not have any bearing with the outcome of the expulsion that night.
: Kristoff was automatically expelled because he received one of the four low grades from the jurors. His low grades made him one of the probationary students for the following week, and it would have been his fifth time of being on probation, with a score of 7.10. His expulsion was due to a new rule implemented by the academy, which states that a scholar is automatically expelled when he/she receives a fifth nomination.
: Rosita was automatically put on probation because she got the lowest grade in the midterm exams. The other three probationary students were determined based on their performances in the gala night.
: Michelle was automatically expelled during the 9th Probation Night because she received one of the four low grades from the jurors of the 8th Expulsion Night. This ensured the safety of the three other probationary students who were named in that episode.
: Although this was Rosita's fifth nomination, her four previous nominations were disregarded as she was finally part of the top ten, or the Headmaster's List. The same can be said with the rest of the top ten.
: Faculty's choice and scholar voting were ruled out for the 11th, and 12th Expulsion Nights. The probationary scholar with the fewest viewer votes was declared the expelled scholar.
: In preparation for the Grand Dream Night, two finalists who got the two lowest viewer votes were expelled this week. Meanwhile, the viewer votes for the six remaining finalists in the academy were carried over to the tally of the votes they need to be declared winner on the Grand Dream Night.

References

External links
Season 1 Official website

Pinoy Dream Academy
2006 Philippine television seasons